The bombing campaigns of the Vietnam War were the longest and heaviest aerial bombardment in history. The United States Air Force, the U. S. Navy, and U. S. Marine Corps aviation dropped 7,662,000 tons of explosives. By comparison, U. S. forces dropped a total of 2,150,000 tons of bombs in all theaters of World War II.

List of bombing campaigns 

Farm Gate: 13 January 1962—January 1965

Operation Pierce Arrow: 5 August 1964

Operation Barrel Roll: 14 December 1964—29 March 1973

Operation Flaming Dart: 7 February 1965—24 February 1965

Operation Rolling Thunder: 2 March 1965—2 November 1968

Operation Steel Tiger: 3 April 1965—11 November 1968

Operation Arc Light: 18 June 1965—15 August 1973

Operation Tiger Hound: 5 December 1965—11 November 1968 

Operation Commando Hunt: 11 November 1968—29 March 1972

Operation Niagara: January 1968—March 1968

Operation Menu (consisting of Operations Breakfast, Lunch, Snack, Dinner, Dessert, and Supper): 18 March 1969—26 May 1970

Operation Patio: 24 April 1970—29 April 1970.

Operation Freedom Deal: 19 May 1970—15 August 1973

Operation Linebacker I: 9 May 1972—23 October 1972

Operation Linebacker II: 18 December 1972—29 December 1972

Notes

Sources
 Hit My Smoke!: Forward Air Controllers in Southeast Asia.	Jan Churchill. Sunflower University Press, 1997. , 9780897452151.
 Vietnam in Military Statistics: A History of the Indochina Wars, 1772-1991. Micheal Clodfelter. McFarland & Company, 1995. , 9780786400270.

Military operations of the Vietnam War